Società Italiana per Condotte d'Acqua SpA, also known as Condotte d'acqua is an Italian company.
Società Italiana per Condotte d'Acqua SpA was founded on 7 April 1880 in Rome, Italy.
It was owned till 1970 by Amministrazione del Patrimonio della Sede Apostolica (the financial arm of the Vatican) and Bastogi.

It was later sold to Mafia banker Michele Sindona who sold it to IRI – Italstat Groups.

History 

Created on April 7, 1880 Already in the current form of anonymous company, the Condotte was the purpose of carrying out water supply work for cities, agricultural areas to irrigate and industries. Its activity then develops mainly abroad, both in Europe, Russia, Siam (Current Thailand) and China. At its 25th anniversary, the company had at its list the construction of 160 aqueducts for a total length of 817 km.

The company then diversified in public works in general. In particular, it realized the piercing of the Mont Blanc tunnel and most metro lines in Milan.

The company was taken over by the Holding of the Italian Tentacular Group IRI and integrated into the Engineering and Constructions branch capped by Iritecna Spa.

In 1987, it established a subsidiary in the United States, located in Miami and covers the entire country where its activity generates a turnover of €56 million in 2007. It has built the Chesapeake-Delaware Suspension Bridge in Virginia, the single-arch Acosta Bridge in Jacksonville, and the Miami Metro in Florida, among others.

In 1997, it is one of the privatized companies following the Italian government's decision to dismantle the IRI. The company is then redeemed by the Ferrocemento Costruzioni e Lavori Pubblici SpA group.

That same year, on December 1, 1997, the Ferrocento Group also bought the company Gambogi Costruzioni Spa, which was part of the Calcestruzzi Group, and the independent corporate Curizioni spa.

In 2016, Società Italiana per Condotte d'Acqua SpA became part of Grandi Opere General Contracting group, owned by Bruno Tolomei Frigerio's Ferfina company.
In 2018 the Società Italiana per Condotte d'Acqua SpA debt level was about 2 billion euro.
In the Summer 2018, Società Italiana per Condotte d'Acqua SpA risked bankruptcy.
The company has still to pay salaries to the 2,800 workers since April 2018.

Subsidiares companies 
Subsidiares Companies are Condotte America Inc. Condotte Romania Srl Condotte Algerie C2i Srl Inso SpA Cossi Costruzioni SpA C.I. Power srl Tenuta Roncigliano Srl.

References 

Construction and civil engineering companies of Italy
Construction and civil engineering companies established in 1880
Italian companies established in 1880